The Four Lines Modernisation (4LM) is a series of projects by Transport for London to modernise and upgrade the sub-surface lines of the London Underground: the Circle, District, Hammersmith & City and Metropolitan lines.

The upgrades entail new rolling stock, new signalling and new track and drainage

Rolling stock 

As part of the upgrade, the entire sub-surface fleet was to be replaced. S7 and S8 Stock manufactured by Bombardier Transportation's Derby Litchurch Lane Works were ordered to replace a variety of rolling stock, these being the A60/62 Stock on the Metropolitan line, the C69/77 Stock on the Circle, District (Edgware Road to Wimbledon section) and Hammersmith & City lines, and the D78 Stock on the District line, which all dated from the 1960s and 1970s.

The order was for a total of 192 trains (1,403 cars), and formed of two types, S7 Stock for the Circle, District and Hammersmith & City lines and S8 Stock for the Metropolitan line. The main differences, aside from the number of cars (S7 having seven cars and the S8 having eight cars), were in the seating arrangements, in which the S7 Stock consisted of a longitudinal-only layout, whereas the S8 Stock had a mixture of longitudinal and transverse seating. New features that were not used on the previous rolling stocks included air-conditioning, low floors to ease accessibility, and open gangways between carriages.

The entire fleet was introduced by April 2017.

Signalling 
Part of the modernisation includes the introduction of Communications-Based Train Control (CBTC) to allow for Automatic Train Operation (ATO). In order to upgrade the signalling, Signal Migration Areas have been created to allow for the gradual installation. Below is a list of the SMAs and their progress:

As a result of SMA 5 being installed, the Circle line began running entirely under ATO and after the completion of SMA 6 the Hammersmith & City line also now runs completely under ATO.

For various reasons including funding and the technical difficulties with sharing tracks with National Rail & the Piccadilly line, SMAs 10-12 were scaled back until further notice.

Originally the SMAs were planned as follows:

References

External links 
 

London Underground